Lookout Mountain, Lookout Sea is the sixth and final studio album by American indie rock band Silver Jews, released on June 17, 2008, on Drag City. It was recorded at Marble Valley of Lexington, Virginia and Lake Fever Productions of Nashville, Tennessee. Silver Jews records are known for featuring different casts of musicians. This album features the touring band of lead singer, David Berman, including his wife Cassie. Berman has said that the album is "really different" compared to previous ones.

Recording
In an interview with Pitchfork, Berman said that while recording he used a new guitar to influence a new mindset. He wrote all of the songs before going into the studio, so that he could make sure each song took "into account its neighbors". The vocals were not recorded until last, as he kept changing the lyrics and wanted to be able to edit them without having to re-record the entire song. Berman went on to say that at the end of recording he wished he had more time to write, as there were still things he would have changed. "What Is Not But Could Be If" was a 'totally different kind of writing' for Berman, and he compared it to bands that sang slogans and epigrammatic writing.

Music
Lookout Mountain, Lookout Sea has been described as one of the Silver Jews' 'lightest' albums.

Track listing

References

External links
Silver Jews website
Drag City: Silver Jews

2008 albums
Silver Jews albums
Drag City (record label) albums